John S. Armstrong (November 18, 1850 – April 26, 1908) was an American real estate developer. He was the co-founder (along with Thomas Marsalis) of the former City of Oak Cliff (now incorporated into Dallas) and founder of the town of Highland Park, Texas. Armstrong was also a founder of the State Fair of Texas.

John Scarborough Armstrong was born November 18, 1850 in Nashville, Tennessee to J. W. and Pauline Armstrong.  He was one of thirteen children. He married Alice J. White on July 3, 1878, in Lancaster, Kentucky.

With his brothers, Dr. V. P. Armstrong and Henry C. Armstrong, he established the Armstrong Meat Packing Company, a wholesale grocery business. Around 1906, he purchased land north of Dallas which he had developed into the residential community of Highland Park.

Armstrong died April 26, 1908 in Dallas, Texas and is buried at Oakland Cemetery. He was survived by his wife, Alice J., and two daughters: Mrs. Minnie May (Edgar L.) Flippen and Mrs. Johnetta (Hugh) Prather.

References

People from Oak Cliff, Texas
1850 births
1908 deaths
People from Highland Park, Texas